Dominic Chatto Bashir Jamilu (born 7 December 1985) is a retired Nigerian football midfielder. He has played three times in Nigerian youth teams.

Club career
Chatto was born in Kaduna, Nigeria. Chatto started playing football in the age of six. He developed into one of the most talented players of his region and was always chosen to lead his team as a captain. Chatto learned to play football in Pepsi Football Academy in Nigeria. Before moving to Nigerian Premier League and Heartland FC he trained also in Highlanders Football Academy. In the league he succeeded so well that, in 2005, he was given a tryout in Blackburn Rovers. Eventually, he did not get a work permit, because he had not played in 70 percent of national team matches. Despite this, Blackburn and Mark Hughes wanted to sign a contract and send Chatto to Cercle Brugge for a loan. Chatto refused to go to Brugge, because he would have had to wait three months to get a playing right for the Belgium league. After England, he visited Dynamo Kyiv and Brøndby IF, but did not get a contract offer. He chose to go back to Nigeria and wait for new offers from European clubs.

Inter Turku 
His professional career in Europe started in 2007, when Finnish Veikkausliiga club FC Inter Turku signed him. In his first season, he was voted as the third-best player in the league and was called up to the Nigerian under-23 national team. After the season, he signed a new year-long contract with the Turku-based club. In the 2008 season, Chatto was linked with a move to Slovakian FC Senec, Serbian FK Partizan and Red Star Belgrade. The owner of FC Inter refused to sell without a large transfer fee and Chatto stayed in the club. In the last match of the championship season Serie A club Atalanta B.C. was scouting Chatto. Some Russian league clubs were after him and also FC Inter offered him a new contract and was hoping to keep the player. After the season 2008, Chatto was voted for Veikkausliiga players' player of the season.

BK Häcken 
In November 2008, Chatto signed a three-year contract with just promoted Swedish club BK Häcken. Häcken had to pay a transfer fee to AS Racine, which still owned his rights. The transfer negotiations started when former Finnish international Janne Saarinen contacted Chatto via Facebook.

Chatto scored a goal against IF Elfsborg in a pre-season friendly. In an interview before the Swedish season, Chatto said that Häcken were hoping for a survival in the premier division, but he hoped that they could reach a top-five place. And when the season was over, Chatto's wishes had come true, as Häcken finished in the fifth place in Allsvenskan

Ordabasy 
In February 2016, Chatto signed a one-year contract with Kazakhstan Premier League side FC Ordabasy.

Falkenberg 
On 10 March 2017, Chatto signed a two-year contract with Superettan side Falkenberg. On 19 December 2019, 34-year old Chatto announced his retirement.

He was brought back to Falkenberg in June 2021 as a scout and possible coach.

International career
He was called up for Nigerian squad for the Intercontinental Cup in Malaysia, but did not play in the team. Chatto was near to playing in the Olympic tournament in Beijing, but would have missed about ten matches with Inter and did not make the trip.

Career statistics

Honors

Club
Inter Turku
 Veikkausliiga (1): 2008
 Finnish League Cup (1): 2008

Individual
Veikkausliiga Best Player: 2008

References

External links
 Profile at glimt.no
 Profile at BK Häcken
 Stats on Veikkausliiga.com
 DailySun: Nigerian player on rampage in Finland
 Pointer: Dominic Chatto
 Video interview in InterView.fi
 

1985 births
Living people
Association football midfielders
Nigerian footballers
Nigerian expatriate footballers
FC Inter Turku players
BK Häcken players
Falkenbergs FF players
Veikkausliiga players
Heartland F.C. players
FK Bodø/Glimt players
FC Ordabasy players
Eliteserien players
Kazakhstan Premier League players
Allsvenskan players
Superettan players
Nigerian expatriate sportspeople in Finland
Nigerian expatriate sportspeople in Kazakhstan
Nigerian expatriate sportspeople in Sweden
Nigerian expatriate sportspeople in Norway
Expatriate footballers in Finland
Expatriate footballers in Sweden
Expatriate footballers in Norway
Expatriate footballers in Kazakhstan
Sportspeople from Kaduna